Bagata is a settlement in the Tskhinvali District/Gori Municipality of South Ossetia, Georgia. It is 7 kilometers from Tskhinvali.

History 
This  Eastern Georgia village used to be in Khetagurovo Community, . In  1991 it was included in Tskhinvali District.

Geography 
Located on Shida Kartli plain.   900  meters above sea level.

See also
 Tskhinvali District

Notes

References  

Populated places in Tskhinvali District